The Albany and West Lodge Bassets is a working basset pack.

History
The Albany and West Lodge Bassets was formed with the amalgamation of the Albany Bassets and the West Lodge Harehounds.

The Albany Bassets
In 1955 members of the Basset Hound Club formed a working branch to "foster the hunting instinct inherent in every Basset Hound", initially all members of the club were encouraged to enter their pet Basset and see if it could work with a nucleus of kenneled hounds.

In 1973 this pack was renamed the Albany Bassets and was registered with the Masters of Basset Hounds Association. The Albany remained a part of the Basset Hound Club until 2002 when they withdrew their support and the Albany became a subscription pack.

In 2002 the hunt outcrossed their Kennel Club registered hounds with working stock to produce a greater working ability, as they felt the Kennel Club standard hounds were becoming too heavy and cumbersome. The aim of the hunt's outcrossing was to produce lighter more agile hounds that could work for longer over rough ground.

The West Lodge Harehounds
The West Lodge Harehounds was initially formed in 1928 by Sir Douglas Ritchie as a private beagle pack with subscriptions being taken from 1934. The pack was disbanded in 1941, but was reformed with basset hounds in 1950.  At the time of their amalgamation, the West Lodge Harehounds comprised a pack of three-quarter Bassets, one-quarter Harriers, along with some Grand Basset Griffon Vendéens in the pack.

The Albany and West Lodge Bassets
In 2006 the two packs amalgamated.  Today the hunt bred working Bassets with chests at least  from the ground, that can hunt for four hours twice a week. The pack consisted of 10 couple of hounds all living together as a working pack. Kennelled by Master and Huntsman Jeremy Ward and supported by his partner Alison Jeffers, the Albany Bassets entered a golden period. The pack become recognised for the quality and excellent condition of their hounds as well as their superb hunting ability. As the only pack of pure-bred hunting bassets in the UK, the Albany and West Lodge Bassets were unique.

The great pleasure of hunting with Basset hounds is that in comparison with other hound breeds they are a slow and methodical mover. This enables the Hunt staff and supporters to keep in contact and see the hounds work as the Basset unravels the line of the scent. Secondly it is the tremendous voice of the Basset as it hunts. The clamour of the Albany and West Lodge Bassets in full cry has no equal in hunting! Thirdly it is the unique character and appearance of this lovely ancient breed working in the countryside.

Jeremy Ward hunted the Albany and West Lodge Bassets for 17 seasons. Without doubt, he was the finest huntsman of the Albany Bassets; an excellent hound-man and a supreme athlete, it was a joy to watch him in the field with his hounds. Jeremy bred all his own hounds and his high standards meant only the best were kept in the pack. 

An injury to his foot curtailed the 2018 / 2019 season. Following the COVID lockdowns, the retirement of Jeremy and other key members of hunt staff forced the pack to disband in April 2021. All the pack hounds were subsequently rehomed to supporters of the hunt, all now enjoy life as a pet. Jeremy Ward and Alison Jeffers took measures to preserve the Albany blood lines. Semen from four dog hounds were frozen for future use through artificial insemination. This semen has been used successfully and is available for others to use. A great legacy of a great pack of pure-bred basset hounds.

Hunt country
The Albany's original country extends from Stamford in the south, Bourne in the north, Melton Mowbray in the west and Spalding in the east, and lies within the boundaries of the Cottesmore Hunt.

The West Lodge's country runs from the northern outskirts of London to Biggleswade and Longstowe in the north, bounded by Harlow and Royston in the east, and Hatfield and Stevenage in the west.  Its country lies within the boundaries of the Cambridgeshire with Enfield Chase and the Puckeridge Hunt.

References

External links
 Baily’s hunting directory, "Albany and West Lodge Bassets", www.bailyshuntingdirectory.com, retrieved 19 January 2017.

Hunting with hounds
2006 establishments in England